Lu Feng (born 12 November 1981 in Luoyang) is a former Chinese professional footballer who played as a midfielder, he spent the majority of his playing career at Henan Jianye, led them to 2 promotions to Chinese Super League in 2006 and 2013 and scored the club's first goal in the top division in 2007.

Club career
Lu Feng started his professional football career with Henan Jianye in 2001, however he rose to prominace in 2003 when in appeared in 26 league games. This led to the transfer to Qingdao and a chance to play in the Chinese Super League. After two seasons with Qingdao he returned to Henan Jianye in their successful fight for promotion to the Chinese Super League after winning the 2006 China League One division with them. He would be a vital member of the team as the club survived within the league and gradually saw them improve  their league standings until they reached third within the 2009 Chinese Super League season and qualified for the 2010 AFC Champions League for the first time. Within the tournament he would go on to play in five games as Henan were knocked out within the group stages.

International career
Despite playing for a second tier club, Lu Feng was considered a promising young player and was given his debut cap against Jordan on 9 December 2002 in a 0-0 friendly. An unimpressive performance saw Lu Feng having to wait six more years before he was given his second cap, against Mexico on April 16, 2008 in a 1-0 friendly defeat.

Honours
Henan Jianye
China League One: 2006, 2013

References

External links 
 

1981 births
Living people
Sportspeople from Luoyang
Chinese footballers
Footballers from Henan
Henan Songshan Longmen F.C. players
Qingdao Hainiu F.C. (1990) players
Chinese Super League players
China League One players
China international footballers
Footballers at the 2002 Asian Games

Association football midfielders
Asian Games competitors for China